Alex Farquharson is a British curator and art critic who was appointed Director, Tate Britain in Summer 2015. As Director, Tate Britain he is Chair of the Turner Prize.

Previously, he was director of Nottingham Contemporary from 2007 to 2015. Designed by Caruso St John it launched with exhibitions devoted to David Hockney (his early London and Los Angeles years from 1960 to 1968) and Frances Stark. Group exhibitions Farquharson curated at Nottingham Contemporary include Aquatopia: The Imaginary of the Ocean Deep (which travelled to Tate St Ives, Rights of Nature: Art and Ecology in the Americas (with TJ Demos), Glenn Ligon: Encounters and Collisions (with Ligon and Francesco Manacorda) (which travelled to Tate Liverpool, Star City: the Future under Communism (with Lukas Ronduda), Kafou: Haiti, Art and Vodou (with Leah Gordon) and The Impossible Prison, held in former police cells at the Galleries of Justice, Nottingham.

Farquharson was an independent curator from 2000 to 2007. Exhibitions he curated at that time include British Art Show 6 (with Andrea Schlieker), which opened at BALTIC, Gateshead, in 2005, and If Everybody had an Ocean, an exhibition inspired by the musician Brian Wilson, at Tate St Ives in 2007 and CAPC Bordeaux in 2006. In that time Farquharson taught the MA curating course at the Royal College of Art and wrote extensively on contemporary art and experimental curating, frequently contributing to frieze, Artforum and Art Monthly.

He was Curator and Exhibitions Director at SpaceX, Exeter, from 1994 to 1999, and was Exhibitions Director at the short-lived Centre for Visual Arts, Cardiff, from 1999 to 2000.

He is a trustee of Raven Row, has served on the acquisitions committees of Arts Council Collection and Government Art Collection and on the juries of the Deutsche Börse Photography Prize at The Photographers Gallery in 2011, London and the British Pavilion at Venice Biennale in 2009.

Farquharson holds honorary doctorates from The University of Nottingham and Exeter University. He holds a Combined Honours BA in English and Fine Art from Exeter University (1991), and has an MA with Distinction in Arts Criticism from City University, 1993.

References 

British art curators
Living people
Year of birth missing (living people)